The Mpumalanga Division of the High Court of South Africa is a superior court of law with general jurisdiction over the Mpumalanga province of South Africa. The main seat of the court in Mbombela (Nelspruit) opened on 13 May 2019. The court also has a local seat at Middelburg. Before the opening of the division, the Gauteng Division at Pretoria had jurisdiction over Mpumalanga and circuit courts of that division sat at Mbombela and Middelburg.

References

High Court of South Africa
High Court
Mbombela
2019 establishments in South Africa
Courts and tribunals established in 2019